Fred Bertelmann (7 October 1925 – 22 January 2014) was a German singer and actor.

Life
Bertelmann was born in Duisburg in the Ruhr area, the son of a chemical industry employee. Aged nine, he became a chorister and later also studied cello, trumpet, guitar and singing at the Nuremberg Conservatory. He also attended acting lessons at the UFA film studios.

In World War II, he fought in the Wehrmacht on one of the Western Fronts and became a US prisoner of war in 1944. He was sent to a camp in Alabama, where he first heard swing music. After his release in May 1946, he returned to Bavaria, where he founded his own band and performed in American GI clubs in Füssen and in Landsberg am Lech. From 1947 onward, he played together with conductor and composer Ernst Mosch, both even appeared in Bayerischer Rundfunk radio broadcasts. In 1950 Bertelmann toured Sweden with Arne Hülphers's orchestra and Zarah Leander. His career was further promoted by the successful record producer Michael Jary and Bertelmann's performances in the first television broadcasts of Nordwestdeutscher Rundfunk (NWDR) in Hamburg from 1952. Here he met with Bibi Jones, both later recorded several duets.

Bertelmann also worked as a solo singer of numerous Schlager songs. His most popular song up to today is Der lachende Vagabund ("The laughing tramp"), published by Electrola in 1957, a cover version of Jim Lowe's song Gambler’s Guitar. The classic Wirtschaftswunder tune sold over two million copies, and was awarded a gold disc. It was itself covered in 1986 by the Finnish actor Vesa-Matti Loiri in his role as Jean-Pierre Kusela, whose song Naurava kulkuri likewise had a great success.

Other hits included Wenn es Nacht wird in Montana, In Hamburg sind die Nächte lang, Zwei Gitarren am Meer, Ein kleines Lied auf allen Wegen, Arrivederci Roma, Meine Heimat ist täglich woanders, Ti amo Marina, Schwalbenlied, Es wird in 100 Jahren wieder so ein Frühling sein, Gitarren klingen leise durch die Nacht, Es ist ein Herzenswunsch von mir, Ich wünsch' dir eine schöne Zeit, Die Mühlen, Mit dir möchte ich 100 Jahre werden, and Amore mio. During his long-lasting career up to the 1990s he published almost 100 singles, eight albums and numerous compact discs. He took part in the German national finals of the Eurovision Song Contest 1958 and 1964.

Bertelmann also played as an actor in the 1950s and 1960s, in movies as well as in classical stage plays, like Götz von Berlichingen or The Taming of the Shrew. He enjoyed considerable success in the US, appearing in television shows of Ed Sullivan, Dean Martin and Perry Como, and performed in a 1961 musical theatre production of Show Boat in Chicago. In Europe he performed together with stars like Marika Rökk Vico Torriani, Hans-Joachim Kulenkampff, and Caterina Valente. In 1972 he founded a show business school in Munich together with Gitta Lind.

In 1966, he married television presenter and actress Ruth Kappelsberger. Bertelmann made his last appearances at the Munich Opera Festival in 2005 and 2006. In late 2013 he suffered from severe pneumonia. He died on 22 January 2014 in Berg in Bavaria.

Songs
 "Tina Marie", 1955, Electrola, 5.
 "Meine kleine süße Susi", 1956, Electrola, 3.
 "Marie mit dem frechen Blick", 1957, Electrola, 15.
 "Bene bene tanto", 1957, Electrola, 13.
 "Der lachende Vagabund", 1958, Electrola, 1.
 "Ich bin ja nur ein Troubadur", 1958, Electrola, 6.
 "Aber du heißt Pia", 1958, Electrola, 7.
 "Ihr zartes Lächeln", 1959, Electrola, 6.
 "Der Dumme im Leben ist immer der Mann" (duet with Chris Howland), 1959, Electrola
 "Tiamo Marina", 1960, Electrola, 30.
 "Einmal High High High", 1960, Electrola, 34.
 "Mary-Rose", 1962, Polydor, 36.
 "Ein Caballero", 1963, Polydor, 39.
 "Es gibt immer einen Weg", 1967, Ariola

Filmography
 1956: Pulverschnee nach Übersee
 1957: Wenn Frauen schwindeln
 1957: Europas neue Musikparade
 1958: 
 1959: Guitars Sound Softly Through the Night 
 1959: Arena of Fear
 1959: Wenn das mein großer Bruder wüßte
 1959: The Blue Sea and You
 1960: My Niece Doesn't Do That
 1960: 
 1961: So liebt und küßt man in Tirol
 1962: Lieder klingen am Lago Maggiore
 1966: Laß die Finger von der Puppe
 1975: Ein Walzer zu zweien (TV)
 1996: Zum Stanglwirt – episode: "Jetzt scha mer mal – Dann seh’ mer scho" (TV series)

Awards
 Order of Merit of the Federal Republic of Germany

References

External links
 Website by Fred Bertelmann
 
 

1925 births
2014 deaths
German male singers
German male film actors
German male television actors
20th-century German male actors
German Army personnel of World War II
People from Duisburg
Schlager musicians
20th-century German musicians
Recipients of the Cross of the Order of Merit of the Federal Republic of Germany
20th-century German male musicians
German prisoners of war in World War II held by the United States